Duryodhan Mahalingappa Aihole is a Bharatiya Janata Party political activist and member of the Karnataka Legislative Assembly. He participated at the 2013 Karnataka Legislative Assembly elections from Raibag assembly constituency and won polling 37,535.

References

External links 
Duryodhan Mahalingappa Aihole affidavit

Living people
Karnataka MLAs 2013–2018
Bharatiya Janata Party politicians from Karnataka
1957 births